Rustem F. Ismagilov is a Russian-American chemist. He is the John W. and Herberta M. Miles Professor of Chemistry and Chemical Engineering at the California Institute of Technology.

Early life and education
Ismagilov was born in 1973 in Ufa, Russia. He received his Bachelor of Science degree in chemistry in 1994 from the Higher Chemical College of the Russian Academy of Sciences before moving to the United States. In 1998, he received a Ph.D. in chemistry from the University of Wisconsin–Madison while working with Stephen F. Nelson. Following his PhD, Ismagilov was a Postdoctoral Fellow with the Whitesides Research Group at Harvard University.

Career
Ismagilov joined the faculty at the University of Chicago in 2001 as an assistant professor. While working in this role, he focused his research on the chemical complexity of biological systems using microfabrication and microfluidics as synthetic tools. As a result, he received a five-year, $40,000 award from The Camille and Henry Dreyfus Foundation and became a 2002 Searle Scholar. The following year, Ismagilov received a three-year grant from the Arnold and Mabel Beckman Foundation to study "the use of microfluidics to control chemical systems in a time-dependent fashion." While conducting his research, he was a recipient of the 2003 Presidential Early Career Award for Scientists and Engineers, 2005 Arthur C. Cope Scholar Award, and was listed among the world’s 100 Top Young Innovators for 2004.

Ismagilov was promoted to the rank of associate professor of chemistry in 2005. Following his promotion, he co-developed a microfluidics technique to find medical-diagnostic applications. He also developed a microfluidic device called SlipChip as a method for precise quantification of nucleic acids in resource-limited settings. In 2008, Ismagilov was the recipient of the American Chemical Society Award in Pure Chemistry, which recognizes significant research done by young scientists. By 2011, Ismagilov was listed by Clarivate as being amongst the most influential 100 chemists based on the highest citation impact scores for chemistry papers published from 2000 to 2010. He was also elected a Fellow of the American Association for the Advancement of Science.

California Institute of Technology 
Ismagilov left the University of Chicago in 2012 to become the John W. and Herberta M. Miles Professor of Chemistry and Chemical Engineering. He was also a 2012 winner of the Wisconsin Alumni Association’s Forward under 40 award. During the COVID-19 pandemic, Ismagilov's laboratory launched a community-based study of COVID-19 transmission.

References

External links

Living people
People from Ufa
1973 births
California Institute of Technology faculty
University of Chicago faculty
University of Wisconsin–Madison alumni
Fellows of the American Association for the Advancement of Science
Russian chemists
Russian emigrants to the United States